Textured or texturized vegetable protein (TVP), also known as textured soy protein (TSP), soy meat, or soya chunks is a defatted soy flour product, a by-product of extracting soybean oil. It is often used as a meat analogue or meat extender. It is quick to cook, with a protein content comparable to certain meats.

TVP may be produced from any protein-rich seed meal left over from vegetable oil production. Specifically, a wide range of pulse seeds besides soybean, including lentils, peas, and faba beans, may be used for TVP production. Peanut-based TVP is produced in China where peanut oil is a popular cooking oil.

History
Textured vegetable protein was invented by the agricultural commodities and food processing company Archer Daniels Midland in the 1960s; the company owns the name "textured vegetable protein" and the acronym TVP as registered trademarks.  Archer Daniels Midland had developed a textured soy protein isolate made with an extruder in the shape of rods or tubes. The soy protein isolate was produced in a small pilot plant and sold for use in chili powder, but the product was not commercially successful.  By 1968, TVP was widely used in a variety of food products, and consumption skyrocketed after 1971, when TVP was approved for use in school lunch programs.  By 1980, similar products were being produced by rival companies in America, but Archer Daniels Midland remained the leader in TVP production.

Manufacturing process
TVP is usually made from high (50%) soy protein, soy flour or concentrate, but can also be made from cottonseed, wheat, and oats. It is extruded into various shapes (chunks, flakes, nuggets, grains, and strips) and sizes, exiting the nozzle while still hot and expanding as it does so. As the pressurized molten protein mixture exits the extruder, the sudden drop in pressure causes rapid expansion into a puffy solid that is then dried. As much as 50% protein when dry, TVP can be rehydrated at a 2:1 ratio, which drops the percentage of protein to an approximation of ground meat at 16%. TVP is primarily used as a meat substitute due to its very low cost at less than a third the price of ground beef  and, when cooked together, will help retain more nutrients from the meat by absorbing juices normally lost.

Many TVP producers use hexane to separate soy fat from soy protein, and trace amounts of the solvent are left after manufacturing. But the few rodent studies that have been done suggest it would be almost impossible to get enough hexane from TVP to cause harm. Measured levels of residual hexane in TVP are around 20 parts per million; and studies in rodents suggest that 5 g/kg is the minimum dose at which undesirable effects may be observed.

Properties

TVP can be made from soy flour or concentrate, containing 50% and 70% soy protein, respectively; they have a mild beany flavor.  Both require rehydration before use, sometimes with flavoring added in the same step.  TVP is extruded, causing a change in the structure of the soy protein which results in a fibrous, spongy matrix, similar in texture to meat.  In its dehydrated form, TVP has a shelf life of longer than a year, but will spoil within several days after being hydrated.  In its flaked form, it can be used similarly to ground meat.

Nutrition
Dried textured vegetable protein is 7% water, 52% protein, 34% carbohydrates, and 1% fat (table). In a  reference amount, it provides  of food energy, and is a rich source (20% or more of the Daily Value, DV) of several B vitamins, including folate (76% DV), and dietary minerals, especially phosphorus, magnesium, and iron (71-96% DV).

Uses

Textured vegetable protein is a versatile substance; different forms allow it to take on the texture of whatever ground meat it is substituting. Using TVP, one can make vegetarian or vegan versions of traditionally meat-based dishes, such as chili con carne, spaghetti bolognese, sloppy joes, tacos, burgers, or burritos.

Soy protein can also be used as a low cost and high nutrition extender in comminuted meat and poultry products, and in tuna salads.  Food service, retail and institutional (primarily school lunch and correctional) facilities regularly use such "extended" products. Extension may result in diminished flavor, although extra seasoning can suffice, but fat and cholesterol levels are decreased. TVP being used by itself as a substitute has no fat at all, and can be effectively seasoned to taste like red meat.

Textured vegetable protein can be found in health food stores and larger supermarkets, usually in the bulk section. TVP is also very lightweight and is often used in backpacking recipes. Because of its relatively low cost, high protein content, and long shelf life, TVP is often used in prisons and schools, as well as for disaster preparedness. Those with soy allergy, however, should avoid TVP.

See also

References

Further reading

Meat substitutes
Soy-based foods
Archer Daniels Midland